The Mausoleum of Abdul-Qadir Gilani, also known as Al-Ḥaḍrat Al-Qādiriyyah or Mazār Ghous, is an Islamic religious complex dedicated to Abdul Qadir Gilani, the founder of the Qadiriyya Sufi order, located in Baghdad, Iraq. Its surrounding square is named Kilani Square. The complex consists of the mosque, mausoleum, and the library known as Qadiriyya Library, which houses rare old works related to Islamic Studies. The son of the entombed scholar, Abdul Razzaq Gilani, is also buried there.

History

The complex was built near the Bāb Ash-Sheikh in Al-Rusafah, on the east bank of the Tigris. Al-Rusafah also contains the mosque of the founder of the Hanbali school of thought, Imam Ahmad ibn Hanbal.

During the reign of the Safavid Shah Ismail I, Gilani's shrine was destroyed. However, in 1535, the Ottoman Sultan Suleiman the Magnificent had a dome built over the shrine, and it exists to this day.

Terrorist incident
On 28 May 2007, the shrine was targeted by a car bomb attack which killed around 24 and injured 68. The attack caused serious damage to the shrine and the mosque, and destroyed the outer wall, a dome and a minaret.

See also
 List of mosques in Baghdad
 Middle East
 Mesopotamia

References

12th-century mosques
Mausoleums in Iraq
Mosques in Baghdad